Brentford End is a small area located in the borough of Hounslow, London to the west of Brentford and east of Isleworth.  It is  little-used name for that section of Brentford situated to the west of the river Brent.

Until the creation of the London Borough or Hounslow it was in the Borough of Heston and Isleworth, in the Administrative County of Middlesex.

The Brentford Town GWR Station was in Brentford End.

References

Areas of London
Districts of the London Borough of Hounslow